In 1932, pilot Hans Bertram and mechanic Adolph Klausmann were rescued while attempting to circumnavigate the world in a Junkers W 33 seaplane. After departing Koepang, Dutch Timor, they endured a storm in the Timor Sea on 15 May and were forced to land in a remote coastal area of the Kimberley region in northern Western Australia. The stranded men spent almost six weeks severely deprived of food and water and were close to death when they were rescued by a group of local Aboriginal fishermen on 22 June.

Circumnavigation attempt
On 29 February 1932 four aviators flew out of Cologne, Germany on a round-the-world flight attempt. The group comprised pilot Hans Bertram, co-pilot Thom, mechanic Adolph Klausmann and cameraman Alexander von Lagorio, and was intended to find potential markets for Germany's aviation industry as well as a goodwill tour visiting German communities along the route. The plane was a Junkers W 33 seaplane (float configuration), registration D-1925, named Atlantis.

Over ten weeks, the group successfully flew through Italy, Greece, Turkey, Iraq, India, Ceylon, Burma, Thailand, Malaya, Dutch East Indies and Dutch Timor.  After arriving in Jakarta, it was agreed that Bertram and Klausmann would continue flying down the Indonesian archipelago and on to Australia, while Thom and von Lagorio would travel separately and the four would rendezvous in Shanghai, China.

Their engine was overhauled in the Dutch naval aerodrome in Soerabaja (now Surabaya), Dutch East Indies and the pair departed from there on 13 May, stopping for fuel at a bay near Koepang (now Kupang) in the western part of Dutch Timor the following day.  At midnight on 14 May Bertram and Klausmann left Koepang for Darwin, expecting the  trip to take about 5 or 6 hours.  They flew over the Timor Sea and had intended to land at dawn the next day but they encountered a severe storm and, low on fuel, were forced to land their seaplane in the first sheltered bay they found.

Lost

Extremely isolated and surrounded by harsh bush, on the first night they were visited by an Aboriginal man but were unable to communicate successfully and he left them. The aviators, with only  of fuel left, decided to attempt a take off and head west in what they thought was the direction of Darwin.

Being unable to find water, they could only think that the Aboriginal man they had met in the other bay might be able to provide help, so they secured the plane and set out to walk back to the previous bay. They were plagued by heat, thirst and hunger and were overwhelmed by swarms of flies. After attempting to swim across an inlet they were chased by a crocodile and lost their clothes. Barefoot and naked they abandoned the search and resolved to return to the plane. After seven days of walking a more inland route, and without water, clothes or footwear, and ravaged by mosquitoes and completely exhausted they arrived back at the seaplane.

Now thirteen days into the ordeal, the pair drained the radiator of the remaining water and removed one of the seaplane floats to use as a makeshift kayak and started paddling in a westerly direction. They paddled for four days and nights and eventually came ashore north of Cape Bernier, east of King George River.
 
Still thinking that they were on Melville Island they decided to walk overland to find civilisation, but when they discovered that they were not on an island they returned to the float. The float had been damaged, so to be able to paddle it again they had to cut off a section.  The shortened float was not as seaworthy as previously used, so they only got a few kilometres before deciding it was too dangerous to continue and they returned to shore where they found shelter under a rock ledge at Cape Bernier. They remained there until being finally rescued.

Search and rescue

The Dutch gunboat HNLMS Flores set out from Surabaya four days after the disappearance to search along the planned route across the Timor Sea. At the request of the German Consul-General, the Western Australian government also commenced a land, sea and air search of possible landing sites. A West Australian Airways de Havilland DH.50 mail plane was chartered for the purpose. Coastal ships from the State Shipping Service were also notified to be on the lookout.

On 13 June a foot search by native trackers found a cigarette case bearing the initials "HB" and a handkerchief which were handed to a missionary passing in a boat.  The details of the location were vague however and a malfunctioning telegraph delayed the information getting to the correct authorities; when it eventually did the land search was resumed with increased vigour. Sixty people were directly involved in the search which by now had received widespread publicity.

The seaplane was located by a search aircraft on a beach near Rocky Island,  from Wyndham on 15 June but there was no sign of the men.  Several days later, the Wyndham Meat Works launch Kimberley arrived at the site and found a note left by the airmen: "27 May 1932. Australia. Today we left the plane in float as a boat in a westerly direction. Bertram."

On 22 June, the men were found sheltering in a cave near Cape Bernier by a group of Aboriginal people.  They were near death and had been lost for 39 days. A police overland party under Constable Marshall arrived a week later and they were taken to the hospital at Wyndham by boat, arriving there on 6 July.  The ordeal had taken 53 days.  Klausmann had become demented as a result of the tribulations and needed to be restrained.

Later events
After convalescing in Wyndham, both men were taken to Perth—Bertram accepted an offer of a flight in West Australian Airways mailplane, departing from Wyndham on 13 July.  The plane was greeted by a crowd of 6,000 at Maylands Aerodrome. In the evening, Bertram made a radio broadcast from the Australian Broadcasting Commission's offices of 6WF, which was the first public relay from Western Australia to the Eastern states.

In Perth, Bertram was befriended by and stayed with the founder of West Australian Airways, Norman Brearley.  He returned to the site of the abandoned plane on 18 September with Fred Sexton, a WAA mechanic.  They brought with them fuel and a replacement float from a de Havilland DH.50 which they managed to fit to the Junkers; they then flew the plane to Perth. They landed in Matilda Bay in the Swan River on 24 September 1932.

Klausmann followed in late July in the Koolinda as he was considered too unwell to fly. He returned to Germany by steamer but never fully recovered.

After removing the floats from the plane, Bertram flew around Australia for several months, visiting cities and towns and giving talks. His arrival at Kalgoorlie was marred when he crashed the plane at the airport causing extensive damage but no serious injury.  Fred Sexton was flown to the town and assisted with repairs.  Bertram returned to Berlin on 17 April 1933 where he received a hero's welcome.

Bertram wrote a book of the experience called Flug in die Hölle (Flight into Hell).  He also had a successful career as a film director.

In 1985, a four-part television miniseries named Flight into Hell based on Hans Betram's book was made by the Australian Broadcasting Corporation.  Gordon Flemyng was the director.

The makeshift canoe was recovered by staff from the Western Australian Museum in 1975 and is now on display at the Aviation Heritage Museum in Bull Creek.

References

Bibliography

 (English translation and adaptation of Flug in die Hölle)

 (republication of Atlantis Is Missing)

External links

Images of bays etc.
Transcript of interview with Michael McCarthy from the WA Maritime Museum, and George Negus

1932 in Australia
Aviation accidents and incidents caused by fuel exhaustion
Aviation accidents and incidents in 1932
Aviation accidents and incidents in Western Australia
Kimberley (Western Australia)